Events from the year 1790 in France.

Incumbents 
Monarch: Louis XVI

Events

4 February - Louis XVI declares to the National Assembly that he will maintain the constitutional laws.
4 March - France is divided into 83 départements, which cut across the former provinces, in an attempt to dislodge regional loyalties based on noble ownership of land.
July - Louis XVI accepts a constitutional monarchy.
12 July - The Civil Constitution of the Clergy law is passed. 
14 July - The Fête de la Fédération is held. 
31 August - Nancy affair.
4 September - Résignation of Jacques Necker.
24 October - Tricolour adopted as the flag of France by the Constituent Assembly.
24 November - The Constituent Assembly passes a law requiring all Roman Catholic priests to swear an oath of acceptance of the new Constitution.

Births
6 March - Jacques Arago
1 April - Auguste Couder
9 June - Abel-François Villemain
29 July - Nicolas Martin du Nord
7 August - Jean-Claude Colin
21 October - Alphonse de Lamartine
10 November - Jean René Constant Quoy
27 November - Alexandre Ferdinand Parseval-Deschenes
6 December - Jean-Baptiste Philibert Vaillant 
20 December - Jean Joseph Vaudechamp

Deaths
6 May - Jacques Antoine Hippolyte, Comte de Guibert
24 May - François-Henri Clicquot
3 July - Jean-Baptiste L. Romé de l'Isle
17 October - André Désilles

See also

References

1790s in France